Indomyrma bellae is a species of ant that belongs to the genus Indomyrma. The species has been observed in Vietnam. It is also a recently discovered species, which was described by Zryanin in 2012.

References

Myrmicinae
Hymenoptera of Asia
Insects described in 2012